The .300 Norma Magnum, also known as .300 NM or "300 Norma" for short, is a centerfire magnum rifle cartridge developed by Swedish ammunition manufacturer Norma Precision.  The .300 Norma Magnum uses a .338 Norma Magnum case necked down to .30 caliber, named to differentiate it from the older .308 Norma Magnum designed in 1960, and has begun to gain popularity in the long-range shooting community. According to the official C.I.P. rulings the .300 Norma Magnum can handle up to  Pmax piezo pressure.

The United States Special Operations Command (USSOCOM) chose the new MK22 Advanced Sniper Rifle which will be chambered in .300 Norma Magnum (designated M1163) as well as .338 Norma Magnum.

References

External links
 https://www.longrangeshootinghandbook.com/socom-chooses-300-norma-mag-asr/
 C.I.P. TDCC datasheet 300 Norma Mag.

Chambering availability 
The .300 Norma Magnum chambering is offered for these factory rifles:

 Sako TRG M10 - Multi-caliber rifle
 Barrett MRAD

See also 

 Norma
 .338 Norma Magnum
 .338 Lapua Magnum
 .338 Remington Ultra Magnum
 .338-378 Weatherby Magnum
 .338-416
 .338 Chey Tac
 .338 Edge
 .338 Xtreme
 List of rifle cartridges
 8 mm caliber

Pistol and rifle cartridges
Magnum rifle cartridges